Flexplace refers to a policy or program that enables employees to have more authority to remote work. It can be the result of a formal agreement between the employer and the employee or it can simply entail the fact that a job can be performed in any context or place. For example, an employee may choose to work in the office or from home or from a client's office or even a café.

It is the workplace equivalent of the workforce policy of flextime and flexbenefits.

Benefits 
Flexplace has multiple benefits, for both the company and the employee. For organizations, it offers the chance of reducing its carbon footprint, through reduced energy consumption, reduced travel costs and parking spaces. For individuals, flexplace schemes have improved performance and productivity as well as an improved supervisor/worker relationship, morale and job attitude.

See also
 Work-life balance

References

External links
Wordspy for usage and genesis

Working time